The following is a list of the more notable summits and sub–ranges that make up the crest of the Metacomet Ridge, a fault-block landform located in Connecticut and Massachusetts, known for its microclimate ecosystems, rare plant communities, scenic vistas, proximity to major urban centers, and recreational opportunities. 

In southern Connecticut, the Metacomet Ridge consists of two parallel ridges; the western ridge terminates near Meriden, Connecticut while the eastern ridge continues north into Massachusetts proximal to the Connecticut River. Notable summits with elevations are included below, listed from south to north. 
In Connecticut: 
West ridgeline

East ridgeline

In Massachusetts

* Estimated elevation accurate within

References

 Metacomet Ridge
 Metacomet Ridge